Mac Tonight is a fictional character used in the marketing for McDonald's restaurants during the late 1980s. Known for his crescent moon head, sunglasses and piano-playing, the character used the song "Mack the Knife" which was made famous in the United States by Bobby Darin. Throughout the campaign, Mac was performed by actor Doug Jones in his fourth Hollywood job and voiced by Roger Behr.

Originally conceived as a promotion to increase dinner sales by Southern California licensees, Mac Tonight's popularity led McDonald's to take it nationwide in 1987. Although McDonald's ceased airing the commercials and retired the character after settling a lawsuit brought by Darin's estate in 1989, the company reintroduced the character 19 years later throughout Southeast Asia in 2007.

History

Original marketing campaign (1986–1989)
The campaign was created locally for California McDonald's franchisees by Los Angeles advertising firm Davis, Johnson, Mogul & Colombatto. Looking to increase the after-4 p.m. dinner business, the agency was inspired by the song "Mack the Knife" by Kurt Weill and Bertolt Brecht, which was made famous in the United States by Bobby Darin in 1959 and listened to different versions of it before opting to create an original version with new lyrics. After deciding not to feature real people or celebrities, the designers settled on an anthropomorphic crooner moon on a man's body with 1950s-style sunglasses; the song and style were designed to appeal to baby boomers and a revival of 1950s-style music in popular culture. The character, who played a grand piano atop either a floating cloud or a giant Big Mac (hence the name), was intended to garner a "cult-like" following, e.g. Max Headroom.

From 1986 to 1987, the campaign expanded to other cities on the American West Coast. McDonald's said that the campaign had "great success" while trade magazine Nation's Restaurant News announced that it had contributed to increases of over 10% in dinnertime business at some Californian restaurants. A crowd of 1,500 attended the visit of a costumed character to a Los Angeles McDonald's. Despite concerns that he was too typical of the West Coast, in February 1987 it was decided that the character would feature on national advertisements which went to air that September and he attracted a crowd of 1,000 in Boca Raton, Florida. During this period, Happy Meal toys modeled after the character were also released at participating McDonald's restaurants. A September 1987 survey by Ad Watch found that the number of consumers who recalled McDonald's advertising before any other doubled from the previous month, and was higher than any company since the New Coke launch in 1985.

Doug Jones performed Mac Tonight for over 27 commercials for three years. Years later in 2013, he recalled "[T]hat's when my career took a turn that I was not expecting. I didn't know that was a career option." Mac Tonight's voice was provided by Roger Behr. Director Peter Coutroulis, who won a Clio Award for a previous campaign for Borax, pitched several commercials which did not air, including an E.T.-like one in which two astronomers watch Mac Tonight drive his Cadillac through the sky.

In 1989, Bobby Darin's son Dodd Mitchell Darin claimed that the song infringed upon his father's trademark without prior permission and filed a lawsuit as well as an injunction for the song to be removed from both TV and radio ads. As a response to the lawsuit, McDonald's stopped airing the commercials and retired Mac Tonight after nearly four years of usage (though the character would make a brief return in McDonald's ads between 1996 and 1997).

Reintroduction in Southeast Asia (2007)
In 2007, McDonald's brought back the character in territories throughout Southeast Asia such as in Singapore, Malaysia, Indonesia and the Philippines. The new Asian-exclusive campaign featured a CGI-animated Mac Tonight dancing atop a McDonald's restaurant while singing and playing a saxophone rather than a grand piano as he played in the original advertising campaign in the United States.

Animatronics

In addition to the advertising campaign, a number of McDonald's restaurants during the early 1990s were also fitted with Mac Tonight animatronic figures which featured the character seated in front of a piano and playing it. The most and only prominent McDonald's restaurant to still feature one of the animatronics is the World's Largest Entertainment McDonald's in Orlando, Florida. Other known locations include a Greenfield, Wisconsin McDonald's known as the Solid Gold McDonald's, prior to undergoing major renovations in 2011.

NASCAR

Between 1997 and 1998, McDonald's sponsored NASCAR Hall of Famer Bill Elliott with Mac Tonight featured on his car. In 2016, the Mac Tonight theme was McDonald's driver Jamie McMurray's Chip Ganassi Racing No. 1 Chevrolet SS throwback scheme for Darlington Raceway's Southern 500.

Legacy
Mac Tonight has appeared on the cover of Saint Pepsi's album Late Night Delight (with Luxury Elite), and The Simpsons episodes "Kiss Kiss, Bang Bangalore" as a cardboard cutout and in "Burger Kings" via Homer's imagination.

Moon Man
Moon Man is an unofficial parody internet meme of Mac Tonight that originated in 2007 on the Internet meme community YTMND, in which the character is depicted as advocating for racism and racist acts. A Salon article compared Moon Man to Pepe the Frog, another meme labeled as a hate symbol. YouTube consistently removes Moon Man videos for violating its community guidelines on hate speech, and AT&T, whose text-to-speech software was used to create the meme, has edited it to filter out the character's name and obscenities. In 2019, the Anti-Defamation League added Moon Man to their database of hate symbols.

See also
Vaporwave
Louis Armstrong - Legendary jazz trumpeter who also covered Mack the Knife

References

External links
 Information on Mac Tonight at Advertisingiconmuseum.com
 Doug Jones as 'Mac Tonight'

McDonald's advertising
McDonald's characters
Male characters in animation
Corporate mascots
Fictional pianists
Fictional singers
Fast food advertising characters
Mascots introduced in 1986
Hate speech
Alt-right